Laura Chang (born in Seattle, Washington) is an American journalist.

Education 
Chang graduated from the University of Washington in 1984 with a Bachelor of Science in communications, with an emphasis in psychology.

Career 
Chang edited the Booming blog of The New York Times, a role she took on after spearheading the paper's coverage of the 10th anniversary of 9/11. Previously, she had been science editor since 2004; before that she was assistant science editor beginning in 1998, then deputy science editor.

Chang joined the Times in 1990. She began as a copy editor on the national desk, then became assignment editor. She also served as a special projects editor, where she handled projects on welfare reform, the erosion of privacy and the spread of E. coli contamination. She was also the Times editor who stayed up all night excerpting the Unabomber manifesto.

Personal 
Chang plays violin with the Park Avenue Chamber Symphony in Manhattan and other chamber music groups.

Bibliography

As editor
 Scientists at Work: Profiles of Today's Groundbreaking Scientists from Science Times. New York: McGraw-Hill Companies, 2000.

See also
 Chinese Americans in New York City
 New Yorkers in journalism

References

Year of birth missing (living people)
Living people
Writers from Seattle
University of Washington College of Arts and Sciences alumni
American violinists
American science journalists
American writers of Taiwanese descent
American journalists of Chinese descent
The Seattle Times people
The New York Times editors
American women journalists
Women science writers
21st-century violinists
American women journalists of Asian descent
21st-century American women